Polythlipta liquidalis is a moth in the family Crambidae. It was described by John Henry Leech in 1889. It is found in China and Korea.

References

Spilomelinae
Moths described in 1889